Elisabeth of Bavaria-Landshut (1383 – 13 November 1442), nicknamed "Beautiful Beth", was an Electress of Brandenburg.

Life 
Elizabeth was a daughter of Duke Frederick "the Wise" of Bavaria-Landshut and his second wife Maddalena Visconti.  On 18 September 1401 she married Frederick VI of Hohenzollern, Burgrave of Nuremberg, who was promoted to Elector of Brandenburg in 1415 and ruled as "Elector Frederick I".  During her husband's long journeys to Italy, Hungary, and to the Council of Constance, she represented him wisely despite the great political problems Brandenburg was experiencing at the time.

She is the ancestress of the royal line of the House of Hohenzollern by her third son Albert III Achilles, Elector of Brandenburg.

Issue 
With Frederick she had ten children:
 Elisabeth (1403–31 October 1449, Liegnitz), married:
 in Konstanz 1418 Duke Louis II of Brieg and Legnica (1380/5–1436);
 in 1438 Duke Wenzel I of Teschen (1413/18–1474).
 John "the Alchemist" (1406–1465), Margrave of Brandenburg-Kulmbach.
 married in 1416 Princess Barbara of Saxe-Wittenberg (1405–1465)
 Cecilia (c. 1405–4 January 1449), married:
 in Berlin 30 May 1423 Duke William I of Brunswick-Lüneburg (1392–1482).
 Margaret (1410–27 July 1465, Landshut), married:
 in 1423 to Duke Albert V, Duke of Mecklenburg (1397–1423);
 in Ingolstadt 20 July 1441 to Louis VIII, Duke of Bavaria (1403–1445);
 in 1446 to Count Martin of Waldenfels (d. 1471).
 Magdalene (c. 1412 –27 October 1454, Scharnebeck), married:
 in Tangermünde 3 July 1429 to Duke Frederick of Brunswick-Lüneburg (1418–1478).
 Frederick II (1413–1471), Elector of Brandenburg
 married in 1446 Princess Catherine of Saxony (1421–1476)
 Albrecht Achilles, (1414–1486), Elector of Brandenburg, married:
 in 1446 Princess Margarete of Baden (1431–1457)
 in 1458 Princess Anna of Saxony (1437–1512)
 Sofie, born and died 1417.
 Dorothea (9 February 1420–19 January 1491, Rehna), married:
 in 1432 Duke Henry IV, Duke of Mecklenburg (1417–1477)
 Frederick "the Fat" (c. 1424–6 October 1463, Tangermünde), Lord of Altmark, married:
 in 1449 Princess Agnes of Pomerania (1436–1512)

References 

   also dissertation, Munich University, 2009

 |-
 

Electresses of Brandenburg
House of Wittelsbach
House of Hohenzollern
1383 births
1442 deaths
Burials at Heilsbronn Abbey
Daughters of monarchs